Eilema leopoldi is a moth of the subfamily Arctiinae. It is found on Java.

References

 Natural History Museum Lepidoptera generic names catalog

leopoldi